Ludlow is a home rule-class city in Kenton County, Kentucky, United States, along the Ohio River. The population was 4,385 at the 2020 census. It is a suburb of the Cincinnati metropolitan area. It received its greatest period of early growth as a rail station.

History
In 1790, the land that is now Ludlow was given to Gen. Thomas Sandford as a grant in recognition of his service during the Revolutionary War. Sandford traded the land to Thomas D. Carneal for land in what is now Ft. Mitchell. Carneal had Elmwood Hall built on the riverfront in 1818. It still stands (as of 2011) at 244 Forest Avenue and is a private residence. Carneal later sold the land to William Bullock, a British showman, entrepreneur, and traveller, who directed John Papworth to design a utopian community for the site named Hygeia (Greek for "health"). Never realizing this plan, Bullock sold the land to Israel L. Ludlow in 1830. Ludlow was platted as a town in 1846.

The city of Ludlow, named for the landowner, was incorporated in 1864.

Ludlow was used as a filming site for the movie Lost In Yonkers, starring Richard Dreyfuss.

Geography

Demographics

As of the census of 2000, there were 4,409 people, 1,739 households, and 1,135 families residing in the city. The racial makeup of the city was 98.46% White, 0.39% African American, 0.09% Native American, 0.14% Asian, 0.18% from other races, and 0.75% from two or more races. Hispanic or Latino of any race were 0.75% of the population.

There were 1,739 households, out of which 33.9% had children under the age of 18 living with them, 43.5% were married couples living together, 15.2% had a female householder with no husband present, and 34.7% were non-families. 30.2% of all households were made up of individuals, and 11.8% had someone living alone who was 65 years of age or older. The average household size was 2.54 and the average family size was 3.18.

In the city, the population was spread out, with 28.8% under the age of 18, 8.9% from 18 to 24, 31.3% from 25 to 44, 18.8% from 45 to 64, and 12.2% who were 65 years of age or older. The median age was 34 years. For every 100 females, there were 95.0 males. For every 100 females age 18 and over, there were 91.2 males.

The median income for a household in the city was $35,509, and the median income for a family was $44,441. Males had a median income of $34,890 versus $26,714 for females. The per capita income for the city was $16,015. About 8.8% of families and 11.0% of the population were below the poverty line, including 17.5% of those under age 18 and 14.9% of those age 65 or over.

See also
 List of cities and towns along the Ohio River

References

External links
  City of Ludlow Official Website
 Historical Texts and Images of Ludlow, Kentucky
 Ludlow Heritage Society & Museum

Cities in Kentucky
Cities in Kenton County, Kentucky
Populated places established in 1864
Kentucky populated places on the Ohio River